Jamie Henderson (born January 1, 1979) is a former American Football player (NFL). He played cornerback at the University of Georgia and was drafted in the 4th round of the 2001 NFL Draft by the New York Jets. He played for the New York Jets from 2001–2003. He is the cousin of American football player, Reggie Brown for the Tampa Bay Buccaneers of the NFL. He has two sons, Jalen Lyght Henderson (born 4-2-02) and Jamie Isaiah Henderson (born 10-2-04). Henderson attended Carrollton High School, as well as Reggie Brown, and played for the Carrollton Trojan football team.

Motorcycle Accident 
On April 3, 2004 Henderson got in a motorcycle accident. He lost control of the bike while making a turn at a high speed and there was no indication that Henderson was speeding or that alcohol or drugs were involved in the accident. He has since gained full recovery from the accident and held positions at the University of West Georgia in Carrollton, Georgia and Murray State University as a defensive backs coach.  He was a paraprofessional at Carrollton Jr. High School and was helping coach track and football at Carrollton High School, Carrollton, Georgia.

References 

1979 births
Living people
People from Carrollton, Georgia
Sportspeople from the Atlanta metropolitan area
Players of American football from Georgia (U.S. state)
American football cornerbacks
Mississippi Gulf Coast Bulldogs football players
Georgia Bulldogs football players
New York Jets players